The Trenton Thunder are a collegiate summer baseball team of the MLB Draft League. They are located in Trenton, New Jersey, and play their home games at Trenton Thunder Ballpark.

From 1994 to 2020, it was a Minor League Baseball team of the Double-A Eastern League until Major League Baseball's reorganization of the minors following the 2020 season. Prior to this, they were affiliates of the Detroit Tigers (1994), Boston Red Sox (1995–2002), and New York Yankees (2003–2020).

History

As a member of Minor League Baseball/Eastern League
Trenton Thunder Baseball was established in 1994 with the relocation of the London Tigers from London, Ontario to Trenton, New Jersey, the London Tigers played at historic Labatt Park and served as a Detroit Tigers affiliate. The London Tigers were previously based at East Field Stadium in Glens Falls, New York under the names Glens Falls White Sox (1980–1984) as a Chicago White Sox affiliate and Glens Falls Tigers (1985-1988) as a Detroit Tigers affiliate. The Tigers affiliation moved with the relocation from London to Trenton but it lasted for one season only before switching affiliations to the Boston Red Sox in 1995. 

On June 4, 1994, Phil Stidham became the first Thunder alumnus to play in the major leagues, for the Detroit Tigers, giving up six runs on six hits, including two home runs, as part of a 21–7 romp by the Minnesota Twins. As a Red Sox affiliate, the club recorded three first-place finishes, but was eliminated from the playoffs in the first round each time. In 2003, the Thunder became the Yankees affiliate, and the Portland Sea Dogs became the new Red Sox affiliate. The switch reflected both teams' fanbases, as Central New Jersey is home to many Yankees fans, while Maine is home to many Red Sox fans. 

In , the Thunder became the first team in Minor League Baseball history to draw over 400,000 fans for 12 consecutive seasons at the Double-A level or below. Through 13 seasons, over 5.4 million people had attended a Thunder game.

Surpassing the previous mark of 8,729, set while Derek Jeter was on a rehab stint with the team, the Thunder set a new single-game attendance record on May 23, 2007, when 9,134 fans attended, to watch Roger Clemens make his second minor-league start, as he worked toward a return to the Yankees. On Sunday, July 3, 2011, a paid attendance of 9,212 set a new record, as Derek Jeter returned once again, for a rehab start.

On September 15, 2007, the Thunder defeated the Akron Aeros to win their first Eastern League Championship Series in team history.  Trenton defended its league title with 5–1 win over the Akron Aeros on September 14, 2008.  The Thunder lost to the Altoona Curve in the 2010 Eastern League Championship Series.

In 2013, the Minor League Baseball website named the Trenton Thunder the Minor League team of the year. Trenton also took home two other awards which included "Promo of the Year" for the Retirement Party for team bat dog Chase That Golden Thunder. The 13-year-old Golden Retriever retired this year and in his final game the team included a bobble head give away in honor of the long time mascot.  The third award was for "Mascot of the Year" which included an online four minute which garnered the most hits of any other team's mascot video.

In 2018, the team began to temporarily rename itself as the Trenton Pork Roll, honoring Trenton's role in developing the Pork roll.

As a member of the MLB Draft League
On November 7, 2020, the Yankees announced that they would end their affiliation with the Thunder organization along with the closure of the Staten Island Yankees in favor of the previously independent Somerset Patriots, located in Bridgewater Township, New Jersey. The Thunder organization was offered the Patriots' spot in the Atlantic League of Professional Baseball. Instead, they became members of the newly created MLB Draft League, which serves as a showcase for draft-eligible prospects.

The Thunder organization won the first MLB Draft League title.

Triple-A Buffalo Bisons
In April 2021, it was announced that the Thunder organization will host the Buffalo Bisons, the Triple-A affiliate of the Toronto Blue Jays. “After 27 years serving as the Double-A home of the Detroit Tigers, Boston Red Sox, and New York Yankees, we are excited to welcome the highest level of Minor League Baseball to New Jersey,” said Jeff Hurley, Thunder GM & COO. “We look forward to working with the Bisons, Blue Jays, and Major League Baseball to make this a successful season start.” The Blue Jays began the 2021 MLB season by calling their spring training facilities in Dunedin, Florida, as a result of COVID-19 restrictions in Canada. Toronto had played the coronavirus-shortened 60-game 2020 season in Buffalo. According to the Bisons, the move to Trenton allows the club to complete a joint renovation project to prepare Buffalo’s Sahlen Field for major-league regular-season games. Buffalo expects the upgrades will “far exceed the new required Major League Baseball Player Development League facility standards, making Sahlen Field one of the premier locations for player training and performance amenities in Minor League Baseball.” 

At the Bisons home games in Trenton, the Bisons wore the Trenton Thunder uniforms and were referred to as Trenton Thunder while the Thunder MLB Draft League team was referred to as Draft League Thunder by the Thunder organzation; the Bisons were still referred to as the Buffalo Bisons on the road and the Thunder MLB Draft League team was referred to as Trenton Thunder on the road. The Bisons played the season through July in Trenton and moved back to Buffalo for August.

Retired numbers (Minor League Baseball/Eastern League)
2: David Eckstein
5: Nomar Garciaparra
33: Tony Clark
42: Jackie Robinson

Season records

Minor League Baseball/Eastern League

MLB Draft League

Playoff appearances (Minor League Baseball/Eastern League)

1995 season: Lost to Reading, 3–0 in semifinals
1996 season: Lost to Harrisburg, 3–1 in semifinals
1999 season: Lost to Norwich, 3–2 in semifinals
2005 season: Lost to Portland, 3–2 in semifinals
2006 season: Lost to Portland 3–1 in semifinals
2007 season: Defeated Portland 3–1 in semifinals; defeated Akron 3–1 in championship series.
2008 season: Defeated Portland 3–0 in semifinals; defeated Akron 3–1 in championship series.
2010 season: Defeated New Hampshire 3–0 in semifinals; lost to Altoona 3–1 in championship series.
2012 season: Defeated Reading 3–1 in semifinals; lost to Akron 3–1 in championship series.
2013 season: Defeated Binghamton 3–0 in semifinals; defeated Harrisburg 3–0 in championship series.
2016 season: Defeated Reading 3–1 in semifinals; lost to Akron 3–0 in championship series.
2017 season: Defeated Binghamton 3–1 in semifinals; lost to Altoona 3–0 in championship series.
2018 season: Lost to New Hampshire, 3–0 in semifinals
2019 season: Defeated Reading 3–0 in semifinals; defeated Bowie in the championship series 3–1.

Trenton Thunder Ballpark

Former names: Mercer County Waterfront Park and Arm & Hammer Park
Address: One Thunder Road, Trenton, NJ 08611
Opened: May 9, 1994
Seating capacity: 6,440
Dimensions: LF – 330 ft, CF – 407 ft, RF – 330 ft

Mascots

Boomer
The Thunder's mascot is a blue "Thunderbird" named Boomer. He wears a Thunder uniform as well as purple and yellow shades.  Boomer traditionally takes part in many of the promotions and activities throughout Thunder home games, such as a race around the bases against a young fan.  Boomer's likeness has appeared on numerous pieces of merchandise, and he is involved with several programs assisting children in New Jersey and Pennsylvania.

Cloudman
Cloudman is the Thunder's newest mascot, debuting during the 2015 season. He is a fearless caped crusader who serves the greater good in our community. The Cloudman's Hometown Heroes program debuted in 2015. Fans have the opportunity to nominate local heroes in their community to be honored in the middle of the seventh inning of every home game. Current and former armed forces members, first-responders and individuals who do good in the community are often nominated. Cloudman can be seen all over Arm & Hammer Park during a Thunder game, usually in tandem with Boomer, the Thunder's original mascot. Together Cloudman and Boomer take part in such in-game activities as shooting T-shirts off into the crowd, racing a youngster around the bases for a prize, and competing against one another to pick the loudest section in the stadium on a given night.

Chase, Derby and Rookie
Chase "That Golden Thunder" was a Golden Retriever who was part of the Thunder family from late in the 2002 season until his death in 2013. He often served as "batdog" during the first inning at most Thunder home games, retrieving bats and balls and returning them to the Thunder dugout. Contrary to popular belief, his teeth did not leave marks in the equipment, as Retrievers are trained to carry birds without puncturing them; however, he did have a golden tooth, due to his bat carrying duties. Later in the game, Chase usually caught frisbees to win a cash prize for a lucky fan.  Chase had garnered significant media attention, appearing on FOX, CNN, YES Network, UPN9, WNBC4, and even Japanese television. In 2008, Chase sired a litter of pups. One of the pups was trained to be his successor and was named Home Run Derby (or Derby for short) in a fan poll during the offseason.  Another of the pups from that litter was named Ollie, and served as a batdog for the New Hampshire Fisher Cats until September, 2016. Chase died July 8, 2013, aged 13. He was diagnosed with cancer in February and had been suffering from arthritis.

One of Derby's pups, Rookie, has been trained to keep the family business intact as a third-generation "batdog". In 2017, Rookie and Derby shared "batdog" duties with Rookie retrieving bats in the first inning and Derby retrieving in the second inning during every game. On January 8, 2018, Derby died from cancer. Rookie became the Thunder's batdog beginning with the 2018 season.

Ownership
Joe Plumeri, Trenton-born and Vice Chairman of the First Data Board of Directors, Joseph Finley and Joseph Caruso are the owners of the Trenton Thunder. Together, they make up Garden State Baseball, LP. Both Plumeri and Finley also owned the Jersey Shore BlueClaws as American Baseball Company, LLC until July 2017. Finley also is part owner of the Lehigh Valley IronPigs.

Roster

References

External links

 
 Statistics from Baseball-Reference

 
Baseball teams established in 1994
MLB Draft League teams
Eastern League (1938–present) teams
Professional baseball teams in New Jersey
Sports in Trenton, New Jersey
New York Yankees minor league affiliates
1994 establishments in New Jersey